Richard Colley Wesley, 1st Baron Mornington ( – 31 January 1758) was an Irish peer, best remembered as the grandfather of Arthur Wellesley, 1st Duke of Wellington.

Biography
Richard Colley (as he was christened) was born around 1690, the son of Henry Colley (died 1719) and Mary, daughter of Sir William Ussher. He graduated from Trinity College, Dublin with a BA in 1711 and an MA in 1714 and an N.F.P. on 6 July 1740 as Richard Colley. In the intervening year he held the office of Chamberlain of the Court of Exchequer (Ireland).

On 23 September 1728 Colley inherited the estates of Dangan and Mornington, in County Meath, on the death of his cousin, Garret Wesley. Less than two months later on 15 November 1728 he legally changed his surname to Wesley.

Between 1729 and 1746 Wesley represented Trim in the Irish House of Commons. He was High Sheriff of Meath in 1734 and he was created Baron Mornington in the Peerage of Ireland on 9 July 1746.

Character
Wellington's biographer described his grandfather as "a civilised and eccentric country gentleman". The diarist Mary Delany (who was Garret's godmother) visiting Dangan in 1748 after a 17-year gap, found him "the same good-humoured, agreeable man he was on my last visit", and praised him as the man with most merits and fewest faults of anyone she knew, valuing wealth only as a means to make others happy. He was proud of, and fostered, his son's musical talent, but he was also extravagant, and died in debt, beginning the cycle of family indebtedness which eventually led to his eldest grandson Richard selling Dangan 40 years later.

Family
The Colley or Cowley family had come to Ireland from Glaston, in Rutland about 1500; Sir Henry Colley was elevated to the Peerage as Lord Glaston by Henry VIII. He married the daughter of Thomas Cusack, Lord Chancellor of Ireland, Catherine Wellesley Cusack (d.1598) whose grandmother was a Wellesley. Upon the death of his cousin, Garret Wesley and his inheritance of the estates of Dangan and Mornington, Richard Colley (d.1758) and his wife Elizabeth Sale (d.17 June 1738) daughter of John Sale, Registrar of the Diocese of Dublin, on 23 December 1719. adopted the name Wellesley (from both Elizabeth's maternal family side from Catherine Wellesley Cusack, her grandmother) and through her husband's family, his cousin, Garret Wesley (Wellesley).

They had one son and two daughters:
Garret Wesley, 1st Earl of Mornington. Garret Wesley's ( Wellesley's) offspring included, Richard Wellesley, 1st Marquess Wellesley, William Wellesley-Pole, 3rd Earl of Mornington, Arthur Wellesley, 1st Duke of Wellington and Henry Wellesley, 1st Baron Cowley
Frances, who married William Francis Crosbie
Elizabeth, who married Chichester Fortescue

Notes

References

Further reading
 
 
 

1690s births
1758 deaths
Irish MPs 1727–1760
Politicians from County Meath
Politicians from County Kildare
17th-century Irish people
High Sheriffs of Meath
Members of the Parliament of Ireland (pre-1801) for County Meath constituencies
Mornington
Mornington